Wednesday Addams is a fictional character from the Addams Family multimedia franchise created by American cartoonist Charles Addams. She is typically portrayed as a morbid and emotionally reserved child that is fascinated by the macabre, often identified by her pale skin and black pigtails. 

Wednesday has been portrayed by several actresses in various films and television series, including Lisa Loring in the television series The Addams Family (1964–1966) and in the television film Halloween with the New Addams Family (1977); Christina Ricci in the feature films The Addams Family (1991) and Addams Family Values (1993); Nicole Fugere in the direct-to-video film Addams Family Reunion (1998) and in the television series The New Addams Family (1998–1999); and Jenna Ortega in the television series Wednesday (2022).

Origin
Addams Family members were unnamed in The New Yorker cartoons that first appeared in 1938. The character that would later be known as Wednesday Addams first appeared in the August 26th, 1944 issue of The New Yorker in an illustration captioned, "Well, don't come whining to me. Go tell him you'll poison him right back." When the characters were adapted for the 1964 television series, Charles Addams named Wednesday based on the Monday's Child nursery rhyme line: "Wednesday's child is full of woe". Actress and poet Joan Blake, an acquaintance of Charles Addams, offered the idea for the name. Wednesday is the only daughter of Gomez and Morticia Addams and the sister of Pugsley Addams. Earlier adaptations depict her as the younger sibling, while later adaptations depict Wednesday as the elder Addams child.

Appearance and personality
Wednesday Addams is a typically young girl (in the original series, she is about six, in the two original movies and animated movies, she is 13, in the Netflix series, she is 15 and 16, and is 18 in the Addams Family musical) who is obsessed with death and is described as very brilliant, with a penchant for doing odd scientific experiments. Wednesday does most of her experiments on her brother Pugsley Addams for "fun" or for punishment. Wednesday has been shown to care for Pugsley, but is often hostile towards him, and has tried to kill Pugsley many times. She enjoys raising spiders and researching the Bermuda Triangle. She has a tendency to startle people due to her gothic personality.

Wednesday's most notable features are her pale skin and long, dark braided pigtails. She seldom shows her emotions and is generally bitter, often sporting a stare forward with blank, emotionless eyes, and seldom changes her expression. Wednesday usually wears a black dress with a white collar, black stockings, and black shoes. In the TV series, her middle name is "Friday", and in the Netflix series, she retains this middle name, because she was born on Friday the 13th. 

In the 1960s series, she is sweet-natured and serves as a foil to the weirdness of her parents and brother; although her favorite hobby is raising spiders, she is also a ballerina. She is stated to be six years old in the television series pilot episode. Wednesday's favorite toy is her Marie Antoinette doll, which her brother guillotines (at her request). She also paints pictures (including a picture of trees with human heads) and writes a poem dedicated to her favorite pet spider, Homer. Wednesday is deceptively strong; she is able to bring her father down with a judo hold. Although she is obsessed with death, the macabre, and enjoys being miserable, she is also good-natured, smiles and dances often, and with a slight distaste for torture.

In the 1991 film, she is depicted in a darker fashion. She shows sadistic tendencies and a dark personality and is revealed to have a deep interest in the Bermuda Triangle (which has remained an integral part of her interests throughout the adaptations) and an admiration for an ancestor (Great Aunt Calpurnia Addams) who was burned as a witch in 1706. In the 1993 sequel, she was even darker: she buried a live cat, tried to guillotine her baby brother Pubert, set fire to Camp Chippewa, and (possibly) scared fellow camper Joel to death. 

In the animated series and Canadian TV series The New Addams Family from the 1990s, Wednesday retains her appearance and her taste for darkness and torture; she is portrayed as having her parents' consent to tie Pugsley to a chair and torture him with a branding iron and ice pick. In the 1990s animated series, no one is allowed to touch Wednesday's pigtails.

In The Addams Family Broadway musical, Wednesday is 18 years old and has short hair rather than the long braids in her other appearances. Her darkness and sociopathic traits have been toned down, and she is in love with (and revealed to be engaged to) Lucas Beineke. In the musical, Wednesday is older than Pugsley.

In the parody web series Adult Wednesday Addams, Wednesday recovers her dark, sociopathic and sadistic nature (although as in the originals any actual horrific acts are only implied and may or may not occur off-camera) and her long braids, connecting with the events and the depiction of the movies and the original cartoons. This Wednesday deals with being an adult after moving out of her family home. 

In the 2019 animated version of the same title, Wednesday retains her emotionless nature and sadistic tendencies, trying to bury Pugsley and tormenting a bully at school. However, despite her gothic strangeness, she's also bored with her macabre and sheltered life, wanting to see the world despite Morticia's objections. This leads to her befriending Parker Needler and the two taking on several of each other's traits, with Wednesday at one point wearing colorful clothes, though ultimately deciding she likes dressing in darker colors more; in the 2021 sequel, she is revealed to love science experiments as well. She also often feels disconnected from the rest of her family for her differences, later realizing that being different is "the most Addams-y thing to be" and growing to love her differences, and has a pet squid named Socrates. Her braided pigtails end in nooses in the first film, and weights in the second.

In the Netflix series Wednesday, Wednesday is the titular character and is interested in being a detective. She has an interest in writing novels, specifically gothic mysteries. She tries to publish her works, but they are seen as far too shocking and macabre to publish. Other than writing, some of Wednesday's other hobbies are cello playing and fencing. She also knows German and Latin. It's mentioned that Wednesday's allergic to any color other than black, white, or grey. She retains her mostly emotionless nature, but opens up during the course of the series: having a best friend, the colorful werewolf Enid; having a love interest; showing her care for her brother more explicitly. Wednesday in the series has psychic abilities, she can see important things of a person's past or future through touch. Because of her abilities, Wednesday is a "Raven" as her visions typically are negative, which causes her to estrange herself from the others, thinking she cannot trust them, though she learns to trust over the course of the series. Her mother, who has similar abilities, tells Wednesday that their psychic visions are based on their own attitude, and calls herself a "Dove" as her visions are usually positive, compared to  Wednesday's visions.

Portrayals

Wednesday has been portrayed by many actresses in film, television, and on stage:
 Lisa Loring: the television series The Addams Family (1964–1966), the television film Halloween with the New Addams Family (1977),
 Cindy Henderson (voice): the animated television series The New Scooby-Doo Movies (Wednesday Is Missing; 1972), the animated television series The Addams Family (1973),
 Noelle Von Sonn: the pilot of the television show The Addams Family Fun House (1973),
 Christina Ricci: the feature films The Addams Family (1991) and Addams Family Values (1993),
 Debi Derryberry (voice): the animated television series The Addams Family (1992–1993),
 Nicole Fugere: the direct-to-video film Addams Family Reunion (1998), the television series The New Addams Family (1998–1999),
 Krysta Rodriguez: the Broadway musical The Addams Family: A New Musical (2009–2011), original cast,
 Rachel Potter: the Broadway musical The Addams Family: A New Musical (2011), Broadway replacement, 
 Cortney Wolfson: the first US tour of the Broadway musical The Addams Family: A New Musical (2011–2012),
 Melissa Hunter: the web series Adult Wednesday Addams (2013–2015),
 Carrie Hope Fletcher: the first UK tour of the Broadway musical The Addams Family: A New Musical (2017),
 Chloe Grace Moretz (voice): the animated feature films The Addams Family (2019) and The Addams Family 2 (2021),
 Jenna Ortega: the streaming television series Wednesday (2022); 
 Karina Varadi: the streaming television series Wednesday (2022; a young Wednesday).

Wednesday is played by Lisa Loring in the original TV series, though far less malevolent than described by the cartoons. In the first animated series from Hanna-Barbera, her voice was provided by Cindy Henderson. Henderson voiced that same character in an episode of The New Scooby-Doo Movies. In the second animated series from Hanna-Barbera, she is voiced by Debi Derryberry.

In the 1977 television holiday-themed special, Halloween with the New Addams Family, Lisa Loring plays a grown-up Wednesday, who mostly entertains their party guests with her flute, and can hear and understand coded help messages by bound-up members of the family, and dispatch help to free them. In the time interval between the original TV series and this television movie, her parents had two more children who look just like the original Pugsley and Wednesday, and they appropriately are called Wednesday Jr and Pugsley Jr, respectively.

The Addams Family (1991) and its sequel Addams Family Values (1993) portray Wednesday more comic-accurately, maybe even darker. In both films, she is played by Christina Ricci. Wednesday's personality is severe, with a deadpan wit and a morbid interest in trying to inflict harm upon her brothers, first Pugsley and later Pubert. In the film Addams Family Values (1993), Wednesday and Pugsley are sent to a summer camp for "privileged young adults" called Camp Chippewa, where Joel Glicker (played by David Krumholtz)—a neurotic, allergy-ridden wallflower camper with an overbearing mother—takes a liking to Wednesday. She refuses to participate in Gary Granger's play, a musical production of the first Thanksgiving. She, Pugsley, and Joel are locked in the "Harmony Hut" and forced to watch upbeat family films to curb their antisocial behavior. On emerging from the hut, Wednesday feigns perkiness and agrees to play the role of Pocahontas, though her smile ends up scaring the campers, as well as her blonde nemesis. During the play, she leads the other social outcasts—who have all been cast as Native Americans—in a revolt, capturing Gary, Becky, and Amanda and leaving the camp in chaos with Pugsley and Joel. Before she leaves, Wednesday and Joel kiss. At the end of the film, however, it is suggested that Wednesday, though she obviously likes Joel, purposely tries to scare him to death after he brings up the subject of marriage.

Wednesday is portrayed by Nicole Fugere in the straight-to-video movie Addams Family Reunion and Fox Family Channel's television series The New Addams Family, which were both produced in 1998.

Zoe Richardson appeared at the Birmingham Hippodrome as Wednesday Addams in a Musical adaptation of The Addams Family on Ice in November 2007.

The Addams Family musical debuted on Broadway in April 2010, with Krysta Rodriguez playing Wednesday. The character is now 18 years old, has "become a woman", and no longer sports her signature pigtails. In March 2011, Krysta Rodriguez was replaced with Rachel Potter as Wednesday in the Broadway cast. The production began its first national tour in September 2011, with Cortney Wolfson cast in the role of Wednesday Addams. 

The web series Adult Wednesday Addams (2013–2015) gained media attention with the third episode of Season 2 in which Wednesday punished a pair of catcallers. While this behavior gained attention from early fans, The Tee & Charles Addams Foundation, copyright owners of The Addams Family, flagged the series for copyright violation resulting in the series being temporarily pulled from YouTube, however as of 2016 the series has been reinstated.

Chloë Grace Moretz voices Wednesday in the 2019 animated movie and in the sequel, which was released on October 1, 2021. The whole family is mostly designed to resemble the initial cartoon depictions, with added details; for instance, Wednesday's hair braids end in nooses in the first film, and weights in the second.

Jenna Ortega portrays Wednesday in the 2022 Netflix series of the same name. Ortega's performance in the series received acclaim from critics; she was nominated for a Golden Globe Award for Best Actress – Television Series Musical or Comedy. The series was renewed for a second season.

Family tree

References

Child characters in comics
Child characters in film
Child characters in musical theatre
Child characters in television
Comics characters introduced in 1938
Female characters in comics
Female characters in film
Female characters in television
Fictional artists
Fictional cellists
Fictional female musicians
Teenage characters in comics
Teenage characters in film
Teenage characters in television
The Addams Family characters